Christine Chatelain is a Canadian film and television actress. She had a recurring role on The Collector as Taylor. Originally an art student in Vancouver, she tried acting as a hobby and quickly gained roles in 40 Days and 40 Nights and 3000 Miles to Graceland.

Filmography

References

External links
 
 Christine Chatelain Fan

Living people
Canadian film actresses
Canadian web series actresses
Canadian television actresses
20th-century Canadian actresses
21st-century Canadian actresses
Place of birth missing (living people)
Year of birth missing (living people)